The Valencian derby or most commonly known as "Derby del Turia", is the name given to any association football match contested between Levante and Valencia, the two main clubs in the city of Valencia, Spain.

History
The first match between Levante and Valencia was played in 1920, during the Regional Championship of Valencia. Both teams did not meet in La Liga until 1963.

Levante has not won an official match in Mestalla since 1937. However, the granotas won a friendly match in Valencia's stadium in 1995.

Head-to-head statistics

All-time results

La Liga

Copa del Rey

Derby in women's football
In the 2016–17 season, both teams played in their main stadium registering an attendance of 8,122 spectators at the Ciutat de València and 17,011 at Mestalla.

References

Football rivalries in Spain
Levante UD
Valencia CF
Football in the Valencian Community
Recurring sporting events established in 1920